Myurella mactanensis is a species of sea snail, a marine gastropod mollusk in the family Terebridae, the auger snails.

Description
The size of the shell varies between 45 mm and 81 mm.

Distribution
This marine species occurs off Mactan Island, Cebu, Philippines

References

External links
 Fedosov, A. E.; Malcolm, G.; Terryn, Y.; Gorson, J.; Modica, M. V.; Holford, M.; Puillandre, N. (2020). Phylogenetic classification of the family Terebridae (Neogastropoda: Conoidea). Journal of Molluscan Studies
 

Terebridae
Gastropods described in 1982